The 2017–18 Boston College Eagles men's ice hockey team represented Boston College in the 2017–18 NCAA Division I men's ice hockey season. The team was coached by Jerry York, '67, his twenty-fourth season behind the bench at Boston College. The Eagles played their home games at Kelley Rink on the campus of Boston College, competing in Hockey East.

The Eagles competed in two mid-season tournaments during the 2017–18 season, the first of which took place during the holiday break, where the Eagles made the trip to the T-Mobile Arena in Las Vegas, Nevada for the inaugural Ice Vegas Invitational on January 5 and 6. The Eagles fell 4–3 to the Michigan Tech Huskies in the opening round, and officially tied the Northern Michigan Wildcats in the consolation round by a score of 3–3, with the Wildcats winning the unofficial shootout to take third place. For their second tournament of the season, the Eagles played in the 66th Annual Beanpot Tournament at the TD Garden in Boston, Massachusetts on February 5 and 12. Boston College faced Northeastern in the opening round, losing 3–0, and fell 5–4 in overtime to Harvard in the consolation game, finishing fourth place for the second consecutive year.

The Eagles finished the season 20-14-3, and 18-6-0 in conference play, winning the conference regular season title. They advanced to the Semifinals of the Hockey East tournament, where they were beaten by eventual champions Boston University. The Eagles, having failed to secure an auto-bid by virtue of winning the Hockey East tournament, did not attend the NCAA Tournament for the second straight year.

Previous season recap
The Eagles entered the 2017–18 season following a semi-disappointing year. While attaining a share of the Hockey East regular season title with their strong 21–15–4 record, they missed out on participating in the NCAA Tournament for the first time since 2009 after falling in the Hockey East Tournament championship to UMass Lowell. Additionally, they failed to secure any mid-season tournament title, placing third in the Ice Breaker Tournament and Three Rivers Classic, and placing fourth in the Beanpot tournament.

Departures

Five Senior Eagles graduated in May:
Chris Calnan – F (Captain)
Austin Cangelosi – F (Assistant)
Ryan Fitzgerald – F (Assistant)
Matt Gaudreau – F
Scott Savage – D

One Underclassmen left the program early to sign with their drafted teams in the NHL:
Colin White — F — Ottawa Senators

Additional:
Chris Shero – F – Not retained on roster from previous season

Recruiting
Boston College adds six freshmen and one graduate transfer for the 2017–18 season: five forwards, and two defensemen.

2017–2018 roster

2017–18 Eagles

As of September 12, 2017.

Coaching staff

Standings

Schedule

Regular season 

|-
!colspan=12 style=""| Exhibition

|-
!colspan=12 style=""| Regular Season

|-
!colspan=12 style=""| Hockey East Tournament

Sophomore defenseman Michael Campoli left the program on December 19, having not dressed for any game in the 2017–18 season.

Rankings

Statistics

Skaters

Goaltenders

Awards and honors

Hockey East Season Awards
Logan Hutsko, F – Rookie of the Year
Jerry York – Coach of the Year
Casey Fitzgerald, D – Best Defensive Defenseman

Hockey East All Stars
Casey Fitzgerald, D – Second Team
Joe Woll, G – Third Team
Michael Kim, D – Third Team
Logan Hutsko, F – Rookie Team

Hockey East Rookie of the Month
Christopher Grando, F – Month of November
Logan Hutsko, F – Month of February

Hockey East Player of the Week
Christopher Grando, F – Week of November 6, 2017
Kevin Lohan, D – Week of February 26, 2018

Hockey East Rookie of the Week
Logan Hutsko, F – Week of February 12, 2018

Hockey East Defensive Player of the Week
Casey Fitzgerald, D – Week of October 16, 2017
Joe Woll, G – Week of November 20, 2017, Week of February 19, 2018

References

External links
BC Men's Hockey Home Page
BC Men's Hockey Page on USCHO

Boston College Eagles men's ice hockey seasons
Boston College Eagles
Boston College Eagles
Boston College Eagles men's ice hockey season
Boston College Eagles men's ice hockey season
Boston College Eagles men's ice hockey season
Boston College Eagles men's ice hockey season